Jey Shir (also Romanized as Jey Shīr; also known as Jey Shīd) is a village in Jey Rural District, in the Central District of Isfahan County, Isfahan Province, Iran. At the 2006 census, its population was 1,972, in 519 families.

References

External links 
 Satellite Map of Jey Shir

Populated places in Isfahan County